"Agitated Screams of Maggots" is a single released by Dir En Grey on November 15, 2006 in Japan and later in Europe and the United States. The limited edition comes housed in a paper casing and includes a sticker. The title track is followed by three live songs, recorded during the It Withers and Withers and Inward Scream tours at Nippon Budokan, Tokyo. The single was later featured on their sixth studio album, The Marrow of a Bone.

The version released in the United States, collaboratively between Warcon and Fontana, was exclusively sold through For Your Entertainment, and marketed as an EP. A live recording of "Agitated Screams of Maggots" is featured on the "Dozing Green" single.
An unplugged version of "Agitated Screams of Maggots" is featured on the single "Glass Skin". This is the last release in which the artist's name is stylised as "Dir en grey".

Track listing

Personnel
 Yasushi "Koni-Young" Konishi – recording, mixing
 Yasman – mastering
 Dynamite Tommy – executive producer
 Keita Kurosaka – cover art
 Yuuichi Fukada – art direction
 Kazuya Nakajima, Yasuyuki Kanoi – live recording

Release history

Music video
The music video for the song is entirely animated, with only a short animated portrayal of the band members. It is created by Keita Kurosaka and done in his characteristically full traditional animation with ero guro-inspired motifs. It has been shown as a film at festivals such as the 2007 International Film Festival Rotterdam for its "animation based on their music exemplifying his fascination for violence and relationships".

References

2006 singles
2007 singles
Dir En Grey songs
Songs written by Kyo (musician)
2006 songs